Dhar or Dar (Nastaleeq: در ,دار or ڈار, Devanagari: धर or डार) is a Kashmiri surname. It is native to the Kashmir Valley in India, and common today among Kashmiri Hindus and Kashmiri Muslims of Hindu lineage (in context of Kalhana and Saligram). Outside Kashmir, it is used by members of the Kashmiri diaspora, in places like Punjab, Bengal, Gujarat, and Maharashtra, and more commonly in recent times by the global Kashmiri Pandit diaspora following the Exodus of Kashmiri Hindus in 1989–1990.

Dhar is also used as a surname by Barendra Kayasthas in the Bengal region of the Indian subcontinent and has similar spellings.

History and origins

Dhar/Dar originated as an honorific given to a village head, strongman, or warlord of a jagir. The title was widespread by the 12th century CE and continued until the 14th century CE. The earliest available records of Dhar or Dar used as a surname date back to the 16th century CE.

Furthermore, Kalhana has explained in Rajatarangini, a book considered vital by historians that the term Dhar comes from the word Dharra (Pronounced : Darra) which also happened to have a connection to an ancient mountain ridge called Kakodar. Kakodar in ancient times was known as Karkotadhara. Kalhana has used the word "similar" for both Dar and Dhar in Rajatrangini, giving modern-day historians a hint of changing pronunciation claims to be true.

Spelling variations of the surname in context of Kalhana 
According to some Pandit historians the surname originates from the Sanskrit word Dharra which translates to "Lord" and historically this term was always used as a Suffix for the mountains of Kashmir e.g. Karkotadharra which is now called Kakodar. Thus the two spellings have a common origin.

The spelling of the surname in Sanskrit was Dhar at the time when the prevalent writing system was the Sharada script; in spoken Kashmiri, the surname Dhar may have gotten distorted to Dar. With the advent of Islam in Kashmir, new Muslims who had converted from Hinduism retained their surname, but may have modified the spelling to differentiate themselves from the Kashmiri Hindu from which they came.

Pandit Historian Kalhana has specifically mentioned Dar/Dhar as a Brahman Family in his book Rajatarangini.

Dar also should not be confused with Dangar or Damara. All these surnames have no connection based on historical evidence.

History and origins in Context of Muhammad din Fauq

A survey of Kashmiri farmers and their tribes in 1891 put forward the census of Brahmin Cultivators of Kashmir. 
This census included following surnames : Pandit, Sofi, Butt, Ittu, Tantray, Dar, Rather, Rishi, Raina, Kandhi, Ganai.

Fauq doubted this list and accepted only two surnames as Brahmins (i.e. Butt and Pandit) claiming others to be Vaish and kshatriya. The superintendent also doubted the claims during the census.

According to Fauq, Dar is a corrupted form of the term "Damara" which is historically used as an umbrella term to refer to both modern day Lone (Lavanya) and Dar (Damar) tribes. In his Book Tareekh e Aqwam e Kashmir, he has specifically mentioned Dars as Troublesome and strong Kshatriya Warlords / Landlords of ancient Kashmir who troubled the Hindu Kings .

Spelling Variations in Context of Muhammad Din Fauq 

Fauq mentions in his book that many authors from Subcontinent when mentioning Dar and other Kashmiri tribes ignored the proper sound of the Urdu alphabet which resulted in corruption of Dar(ڈار) into Daar (دار) which is very close to Hindu surname Dhar (در).

Persian, Kashmiri Pandits and its effects

"The scholarship of the Pandits in Persian reached its high watermark during this period. They wrote exquisite poetry in Persian and were master writers in prose. Munshi Bhawani Das stands preeminent amongst the prose writers of the day. So also Lachhi Ram Saroor who rose very high at the Court of Nawabs of Oudh mainly because of his high poetical merit. Rai Rayan Anand Ram Karihalu was a great favourite of Shah Alam II and a great poet. He was a great Persian and Arabic scholar. So also Pandit Taba Ram Turki (1776 A.D. to 1847 A.D.), Sat Ram Baqaya, Pandit Daya Ram Kachru (1743 A.D. to 1811 A.D.) Aftab Bhan, Gobind Kaul, Kailas Dar (died 1772 A.D.) Lasa Kaul, Deva Kaul, Thakur Das, Gopal Dar (1735 A.D. to 1798 A.D.). Raja Kak Dar, Rugh Nath Kaul (1735 to 1807 A.D.) and many others. The contributions made by them to Persian literature have elicited the significant remarks from competent critics that in the mastery of the Persian language the Kashmiri Pandits were second only to the Persians. About pandit Anand Ram Karihalu it is remarked that his mastery of Arabic and Persian was so complete that even amongst the Muslims nobody could compete with him. Pandit Birbar Kachru (1789-1859 A.D.) to whom reference has been made in these pages has written a voluminous history of Kashmir. He has dealt with social and economic conditions of the people in a very detailed and lucid manner. Pandit Anand Ram Pahalwan has carried the History of Kashmir by Narain Kaul from 1712 A.D. to 1785 A.D. Birbar Kachru, besides being a historian, wrote good poetry as well. The Kashmir Pandits of this period were very orthodox in religion, but that did not cripple their minds. In outdoor life they hayed and described themselves as any other citizen would do. The use of words like Banda, Bandai Chas, Bandai Dargah, Ahqar, Ibn etc with their names would show this. Not only that. They offered sometimes their prayers also in Persian language, and prefixed even their Gods with such epithets as Hazrat."

This specific passage explains the probability that there is a high chance many Sanskrit surnames may have been influenced by Persian in the Early Kashmiri Hindu community. Not to ignore that even in the Modern Era a Popular Pandit surname Bhatt is written as Batt / Butt by Potohari / Punjabi Speaking Muslims of Kashmiri descent (or ethnic bloodline) around the world which may also have similar reasons.

Influence on Kashmir

Some Historical accounts clearly record the involvement of people belonging to modern day Dar tribe in Kashmir's politics.

When Hasan Shah wanted to settle Syeds in Kashmir his decision was greatly revolted by People belonging to Dar, Raina, Magre (Magray) and Thakar (Thakur) tribes of Kashmir.

In another book it is mentioned that:

The defeat of the Sayyids brought to the fore front four Kashmiri Leaders. Jahangir Magre, Saif Dar, Idi Raina and Shams Chak. Jahangir Magre has said to be later overthrown by Malik Saif Dar. 

Furthermore, Sir Walter Roper Lawrence writes in his book Valley of Kashmir that "Among the leading Krams may be mentioned the following names:— Tikku, Razdan, Kak, Munshi, Mathu, Kachru, Pandit, Sapru, Bhan, Zitshu, Raina, Dar, Fotadar, Madan, Thusu, Wangnu, Muju, Hokhu, and Dulu. Of these the members of the Dar family have probably been the most influential, though proverbs suggest that their influence has not been beneficial"

"Dar na baiyad guzisht be zangir"

The Dars like doors should be locked up

- A Kashmiri proverb.

Notable people surnamed Dhar or Dar

Farooq Ahmed Dar, liberation leader
Aneek Dhar, Indian singer
Angira Dhar, Indian actress
Anuj Dhar, Indian author and journalist
Aditya Dhar, film director
Birbal Dhar, leader of Kashmiri resistance to Afghan rule
Divya Dhar
Farooq Ahmed Dar, JKLF leader
Humayon Dar, Islamic economist and Shari'a advisor
KSHMR (real name Niles Hollowell-Dhar), Indo-American EDM artist
Kiran Kumar, Indian actor
Maqbool Dar, Minister of State for Home Affairs, India
Meeraji (born Mohammed Sanaullah Dar), Urdu poet-scholar, considered one of the fathers of modernism in Urdu literature
Mirza Pandit Dar
Muhammad Ahsan Dar, founder and former Hizbul Mujahideen commander
 Muhammad Nasir Dar, PAF Shaheed
Sandeepa Dhar, Bollywood actress
Sheila Dhar, Kashmiri Indian author and singer
Sudhir Dar (1932–2019), cartoonist
Ratan Nath Dhar Sarshar, Urdu novelist

Sportspeople 

Asif Dar, boxer
Aleem Dar, Pakistani Umpire
Haroon Rasheed, former Pakistani test cricketer and manager
Munir Ahmed Dar, field hockey
Nida Dar, female Pakistani test cricketer 
Raza Ali Dar, Pakistani Cricketer
Rumeli Dhar, Indian cricketer
Tabarak Dar, Bangkok cricketer 
Tanvir Dar, field hockey

Politicians 

Durga Prasad Dhar, ambassador of India to the Soviet Union
Ishaq Dar, Pakistani Finance Minister
Kiran Imran Dar, politician and MNA for women from Punjab
P. N. Dhar, Principal Secretary to Indira Gandhi in India
Sh Rohail Asghar Dar, Pakistani Member of Parliament
Usman Dar, Politician from Sialkot
Abdul Rashid Dar, Politician from Jammu and Kashmir

See also
Kashmiri Muslim tribes from Hindu lineage

References

Kashmiri Brahmins
Kashmiri tribes
Indian surnames
Hindu surnames
Pakistani names
Mulla Brahmins
Kashmiri-language surnames
Social groups of Jammu and Kashmir